Watkins Books is London's oldest esoteric bookshop. It specialises in esotericism, mysticism, occultism, oriental religion and contemporary spirituality.
The book store was established by John M. Watkins, a friend of Madame Blavatsky, in 1897 at 26 Charing Cross. John Watkins had already been selling books via a catalogue which he began publishing in March 1893. The first biography of Aleister Crowley recounts a story of Crowley making all of the books in Watkins magically disappear and reappear.

Geoffrey Watkins (1896–1981) owned and managed the store after his father. He was also an author and publisher, with notable books including first publishing Carl Gustav Jung's 1925 edition of Septem Sermones ad Mortuos.

In 1901, Watkins Books moved to 21 Cecil Court where it has been continuously trading ever since. It publishes a magazine called the Watkins' Mind Body Spirit magazine, which has featured leading authors from mind-body-spirit and esoteric fields. Watkins Books has been owned by Etan Ilfeld since March 2010. Since then, a new website has been launched, and the store regularly hosts book launches and signings. Additionally, the Watkins website has integrated a spiritual map of London that everyone is invited to contribute to. Watkins Books has also published a free Mind Body Spirit app that is available on the iPhone/iPad and Android devices.

Watkins makes an annual list of "the 100 Most Spiritually Influential Living People," which is published online and in the spring issue of their magazine. The three main factors used to compile the list are that the person has to be alive, the person has to have made a unique and spiritual contribution on a global scale, and the person is frequently googled, appears in Nielsen Data and is actively talked about on the Internet.

References

External links

 

1897 establishments in England
Bookshops in London
Esotericism
Independent bookshops of the United Kingdom
Publishing companies based in London
Retail companies established in 1897